Hermanas is a 2005 drama film written and directed by Julia Solomonoff, her first feature motion picture. The picture has a number of producers, including: Mariela Besuievski, Pablo Bossi, Florencia Enghel, Gerardo Herrero, Vanessa Ragone, Walter Salles, and Ariel Saúl.

The film features Valeria Bertuccelli, Ingrid Rubio, among others.

Plot
In 1976, during the political turmoil in Argentina, two sisters flee their country right after Natalia's politically active boyfriend Martin disappears; one goes to Spain, and the other to Texas, United States.

After eight years in Spain, Natalia (Ingrid Rubio) travels to Texas to visit her sister Elena (Valeria Bertuccelli), who's now a suburban wife and mother.

She brings with her their father's manuscript of his last novel. The unpublished novel reveals the story of their family during the Argentine dictatorship.

Using extensive flashbacks of the sisters early years in Argentina during the junta dictatorship, the director reveals family guilt and suppressed resentment.

Cast
 Valeria Bertuccelli as Elena Levín
 Ingrid Rubio as Natalia Levin
 Adrián Navarro as Sebastián Morini
 Nicolás Pauls as Martín García Solís
 Milton De La Canal as Tomás Morini
 Horacio Peña as David Levin
 Mónica Galán as Marta Levín
 Eusebio Poncela as Luis Morini
 Pedro Pascal as Steve
 Gustavo Pastorini as American Tourist

Background

The film is based on the real political events that took place in Argentina after Jorge Rafael Videla's reactionary military junta assumed power on March 24, 1976.  During the junta's rule: the parliament was suspended, unions, political parties and provincial governments were banned, and in what became known as the Dirty War between 9,000 and 30,000 people deemed left-wing "subversives" disappeared from society.

Critical reception
Jeannette Catsoulis, film critic for The New York Times liked the film, especially the acting of Valeria Bertuccelli and Ingrid Rubio, and wrote, "Though constrained by a directing style that insists on coloring within the lines, the movie is most successful in the rocky emotional spaces in which the sisters renegotiate their relationship and in which Elena, struggling with English, endures the painful process of assimilation...both actresses make their director look very good indeed."

In the same vein, Jonathan Holland, film critic for Variety magazine, appreciated the acting but gave the film a mixed review and wrote, "The political skeleton of 1970's Argentina rolls out of the closet to mostly positive effect in Julia Solomonoff's Sisters, a solidly-built but somewhat airless debut from the assistant director of The Motorcycle Diaries. The complex plot doesn't fully exploit the possibilities for suspense, but first-class perfs, great atmospherics and an upbeat message combine to make the pic work better as a sibling drama than as a thriller."

Critic V.A. Mesetto thought the screenplay was predictable but also likes the acting, and wrote, "Solomonoff draws out vivid performances by Valeria Bertuccelli (Elena) and Ingrid Rubio (Natalia) that make up for the script's predictability."

Film critic Ed Gonzalez wrote, "Solomonoff doesn't strike very interesting contrasts between past and present, but her actresses certainly do: Rubio and Bertucelli express how resentment eats away at their characters' sisterhood so richly that the many flashbacks to Argentina, shot uninterestingly in gritty hand-held gestures, seem almost unnecessary."

Distribution
The film was first presented at the Buenos Aires International Festival of Independent Cinema on April 14, 2005. It opened wide in the country on April 28, 2005.

The film was screened at various film festivals, including: the Toronto International Film Festival, Canada, on September 9, 2005; the São Paulo International Film Festival, Brazil; the Valladolid International Film Festival, Spain; the Bangkok International Film Festival, Thailand; the Toulouse Latin America Film Festival, France; and others.

In the United States it opened in New York City on December 6, 2006.

DVD
A Region 2 DVD, was released in Europe on May 16, 2006 by Cameo Media.

Reception

Awards
Nominations
 Valladolid International Film Festival: Golden Spike, Julia Solomonoff; 2005.
 Butaca Awards: Butaca; Best Catalan Film Actress, Ingrid Rubio; 2006.
 Argentine Film Critics Association Awards: Silver Condor; Best Actress, Valeria Bertuccelli; Best Costume Design, Beatriz De Benedetto and Fátima Macera; 2006.

References

External links
 
 
 Hermanas at the cinenacional.com 
 Hermanas film review at Leer Cine by Daniela Vilaboa 
 Hermanas film trailer at YouTube

2005 films
2000s political drama films
Dirty War films
Films about Latin American military dictatorships
Films set in the 1970s
Films set in the 1980s
Argentine independent films
2005 independent films
2000s Spanish-language films
Brazilian independent films
Spanish independent films
2005 drama films
Films scored by Lucio Godoy
Films set in Texas